The 1812 Homestead Farm and Museum, sometimes known as the 1812 Homestead or the 1812 Homestead Inn, is a historic house located in Willsboro, New York, that currently operates as a living history museum.

Originally constructed in 1813 as an inn, the homestead now offers tours and programming allowing the visitors to experience what life was like at that time and educates visitors on 19th-century heritage. It is also the current home of the Burt School, which was originally located in Essex.

References

External links
1812 Homestead Educational Foundation

Hotel buildings completed in 1813
Museums in Essex County, New York
Historic house museums in New York (state)
Houses in Essex County, New York
Living museums in New York (state)